Antelope Dam or Antelope Valley Dam (National ID # CA00037) is a dam in Plumas County, California, part of the California State Water Project.

It impounds Indian Creek for water storage, recreation and wildlife conservation, part of the state's larger Upper Feather River Project. The dam is owned and operated by the Department. The site is surrounded by the Plumas National Forest.

The major tributaries are Indian, Boulder, Lone Rock, Antelope, and Little Antelope Creeks.

The outlet is Indian Creek, a tributary of the East Branch North Fork Feather River.

The Antelope Complex, Moonlight, and Walker Fires all burned within the vicinity of the lake.

Recreation includes fishing (for stocked rainbow and brook trout, smallmouth bass, largemouth bass, and channel catfish), camping in the 194 campsites of the surrounding Antelope Lake Recreation Area, boating, swimming, hunting, and hiking.

See also 
 List of dams and reservoirs in California
 List of lakes in California

References 

California State Water Project
Dams completed in 1964
Dams in California
Reservoirs in Plumas County, California
United States state-owned dams
Dams in the Feather River basin
California Department of Water Resources dams
Earth-filled dams
Reservoirs in California
Reservoirs in Northern California